William Devine (22 August 1933 – 16 April 1997) was a Scottish professional footballer who played as a left winger in the Scottish League and the English Football League. He was born in Ayr.

References

1933 births
1997 deaths
Footballers from Ayr
Scottish footballers
Association football wingers
St Mirren F.C. players
Watford F.C. players
Partick Thistle F.C. players
Accrington Stanley F.C. (1891) players
Cambridge City F.C. players
Scottish Football League players
English Football League players